Feather Float  is the second album the Japanese band OOIOO, a side-project of Boredoms member Yoshimi P-We.

Track listing

Personnel
Sourced from AllMusic.

OOIOO
 Yoshimi P-We - vocals, guitar, Casio, Juno, piano, Jew's harp, scratching, bird calls, effects, bongos, djembe, talking drum
 Kyoko - vocals, guitar, handclaps
 Maki - bass, handclaps
 Yoshiko - drums, handclaps

Technical personnel

 Hiroko Wayama - Executive Producer
 Masayo Takise - Mastering
 Hara - Mixing
 Teruyo Ue - Artwork
 Yoshimi P We - Lyricist, Producer, Artwork, Design

Releases information

References

External links
 Feather Float at Birdman Records

1999 albums
OOIOO albums